A magnon is a collective excitation of the electrons' spin structure in a crystal lattice.

Magnon may also refer to:

Places
 Magnon, Gabon, a village

People
 Jean Magnon (died 1662), French playwright
 Leonor Villegas de Magnon (1876–1955), political activist, teacher, and journalist
 Magnon, the 19th-century landowner in Les Eyzies, France, on whose land was discovered Cro-Magnon Man

Other uses
 Magnon Solutions, an Indian company

See also
 Cro-Magnon, early humans
 Cro-Magnon (disambiguation)